Atmeyan or At Meyan or Atmian or Atmiyan may refer to:
 Atmeyan, Ahar
 Atmeyan-e Sofla, Sarab County
 Atmeyan-e Vosta, Sarab County